Carlos Garnett (December 1, 1938 – March 3, 2023) was a Panamanian-American jazz saxophonist.

Biography
Garnett was born on December 1, 1938, in Red Tank, Panama Canal Zone. He became interested in jazz after hearing the music of Louis Jordan and James Moody in short films. He taught himself to play saxophone as a teenager and played with soldiers from the nearby United States Army base. In 1957 he started playing in calypso and Latin music groups.

After moving to New York in 1962, he played in a rock 'n' roll group led by Leo Price. Around this time he also started learning music theory, being self-taught and having always played by ear. Jazz trumpeter Freddie Hubbard hired him in 1968 and introduced him to many New York musicians. Garnett's first recording was Hubbard's 1969 album A Soul Experiment, which contained two original compositions by him.

In the late 1960s and early 1970 Garnett also played with Art Blakey's Jazz Messengers, Charles Mingus and Miles Davis. He led his own group called the Universal Black Force. His group recorded five albums for three years between 1974 and 1977. In 1982, Garnett, suffering from depression and drug abuse, experienced a spiritual awakening and stopped playing music for years. He began performing again in 1991 and released the albums Fuego en mi alma (1996), Under Nubian Skies (1999) and Moon Shadow (2001). In 2000 he moved back to Panama.

Garnett performed at three editions of the annual Panama Jazz Festival. The 9th Annual Panama Jazz Festival in 2012, organized by Panamanian pianist Danilo Perez, was dedicated to Carlos Garnett in recognition of his contribution to music.

Garnett was invited to perform in Japan, where they were interested in his earlier "funk" music, and in Austria twice. His album Shekina's Smile was named after his daughter.

Garnett died on March 3, 2023, at the age of 84.

Discography

As leader
 Journey to Enlightenment (Muse, 1974)
 Black Love (Muse, 1974)
 Let This Melody Ring On (Muse, 1975)
 Cosmos Nucleus (Muse, 1976)
 The New Love (Muse, 1977)
 Resurgence (Muse, 1996)
 Fuego En Mi Alma (HighNote, 1996)
 Under Nubian Skies (HighNote, 1999)
 Moon Shadow (Savant, 2001)

As sideman
With Miles Davis
 In Concert: Live at Philharmonic Hall (Columbia, 1972)
 On the Corner (Columbia, 1972)
 Big Fun (Columbia, 1974)
 Get Up with It (Columbia, 1974)

With Norman Connors
 Dance of Magic (1972) 
 Dark of Light (1973)
 Love from the Sun (Buddah, 1974) 
 Slewfoot (1975)
 Saturday Night Special (1976)

With Pharoah Sanders
 Black Unity, 1971 
 Live at the East (Impulse!, 1972)

With others
 A Soul Experiment, Freddie Hubbard (Atlantic, 1969)
 Jazz Messengers '70, Art Blakey (Catalyst, 1970)
 Lift Every Voice, Andrew Hill (Blue Note, 1970)
 Understanding, Roy Brooks (Reel to Real, recorded 1970)
 Terra Nova, Robin Kenyatta (1973)
 I'll Do Anything for You, Denroy Morgan (1991)
 Slammin' & Jammin, Charles Earland (1998)
 Jersey Blues, Woody Shaw (2004)
 Ghetto Child, Charley Anderson (2008)

See also
 List of jazz arrangers

References

External Links
 
 

1938 births
2023 deaths
American jazz tenor saxophonists
American male saxophonists
American jazz soprano saxophonists
American jazz alto saxophonists
The Jazz Messengers members
Muse Records artists
21st-century saxophonists
American male jazz musicians
HighNote Records artists
Zonians